Tafeng Town is a town and the county seat of Lanshan County, Hunan, China. It is divided into 21 villages and 6 communities, the seat of the town is at Gucheng Village.

Geography
Tafeng is located in the central Lanshan. It is bordered to the north by Nanshi and Tushi townships, to the east by Taipingyu and Maojun towns, to the south by Jiangdong and Suocheng townships, to the west by Huiyuan, Litou and Citangyu townships.

History
The modern-day Tafeng Town is the land of the historic Chengguan Town, Gucheng Township, Longxi Township, Zhuguansi Township and Zongshi Township.<ref>, 108cun.com, also see the change of township-level divisions of Lanshan in 1986 and in 1995: yzdaw.gov.cn</ref>

The former Tafeng Town was part of the historic Zhengzhong Town in 1949, part of the historic Zhengzhong District in 1950. The Chengguan Town was created from part of the historic Zhengzhong District in 1952. With establishing the Dongfeng People's Commune, the Chengguan Town was merged with Gucheng, Longxi and Huiyuan three townships in 1958. The Chengguan Town was reformed in 1962, the Gucheng Towhship was merged to the Chengguan in 1987. The Longxi Township was merged into the Chengguan, meanwhile the Chengguan Town was renamed as Tafeng Town, Zongshi Township was merged to  Zhuguansi Town in June 1995. On November 18, 2015,  the modern-day Tafeng Town was reformed by merging the former Zhuguansi Town, the former Tafeng Town and 21 villages of Maojun Town''.

References 

Lanshan County
County seats in Hunan